Eodorcadion intermedium is a species of beetle in the family Cerambycidae. It was described by Jakovlev in 1890. It is known from Mongolia.

Subspecies
 Eodorcadion intermedium intermedium (Jakovlev, 1890)
 Eodorcadion intermedium kozlovi (Suvorov, 1912)

References

Dorcadiini
Beetles described in 1890